The Octopodidae comprise the family containing the majority of known octopus species.

Genera
The World Register of Marine Species lists these genera:

Abdopus Norman & Finn, 2001
Ameloctopus Norman, 1992
Amphioctopus P. Fischer, 1882
Callistoctopus Taki, 1964
Cistopus Gray, 1849
Euaxoctopus Voss, 1971
Galeoctopus Norman, Boucher & Hochberg, 2004
Grimpella Robson, 1928
Hapalochlaena Robson, 1929
Histoctopus Norman, Boucher-Rodoni & Hochberg, 2009
Lepidoctopus Haimovici & Sales, 2019
Macrochlaena Robson, 1929
Macroctopus Robson, 1928
Macrotritopus Grimpe, 1922
Octopus Cuvier, 1798
Paroctopus Naef, 1923
Pinnoctopus d'Orbigny, 1845
Pteroctopus P. Fischer, 1882
Robsonella Adam, 1938
Scaeurgus Troschel, 1857
Teretoctopus Robson, 1929
Thaumoctopus Norman & Hochberg, 2005
Wunderpus Hochberg, Norman & Finn, 2006

References

External links

 Tree of Life Octopodidae
 Octopodidae movies
 TONMO.com provides cephalopod family discussion forums, videos, etc.

 
Cephalopod families